Daniel Alvarado Nieves (born March 7, 1973) is a Mexican luchador, or professional wrestler, better known by the ring name Brazo de Platino ("Platinum Arm"). He is a part of the extensive Alvarado wrestling family that was founded by his father Shadito Cruz and includes Alvarado's five older brothers as well as a large number of third-generation wrestlers. Most of the wrestlers in the Alvarado family is using or has used a ring name with the word "Brazo" ("Arm") in it at some point in their career. Alvarado has worked for a number of Mexican professional wrestling promotion, but is currently working on the Mexican Independent circuit and not permanently for one specific promotion.

Professional wrestling career
Daniel Alvarado Nieves was the youngest of six sons of Shadito Cruz and the last one to make his debut in 1986 after training under both his father and his brother Jesús Alvarado Nieves, better known as Brazo de Oro. Initially he wrestled as Shadito Cruz Jr. and is the only Alvarado sibling to officially be billed as such.

Brazo de Platino
After a few years as a professional wrestler Daniel Alvarado adopted a new ring name and character, Brazo de Platino ("Platinum Arm"), a name inspired by the ring name of his older brothers Brazo de Oro, Brazo de Plata, and El Brazo. The last two Alvarado siblings also adopted "Brazo" names and became Súper Brazo and Brazo Cibernético. While his three oldest brothers had worked as "Los Brazos" and other Brazos had at times replaced one of them, Brazo de Platino, Brazo Cibernético, and Súper Brazo worked as Los Nuevo Brazos for the Universal Wrestling Association starting in 1992. By 1994 the UWA collapsed and stopped promoting shows altogether. In the years following the collapse of the UWA Brazo de Platino became a regular on the Mexican independent circuit, especially around Mexico City, oftentimes teaming with Súper Brazo  and Brazo Cibernético until the death of Brazo Cibernético in 1999. In 2000 Brazo de Platino began working regularly for Consejo Mundial de Lucha Libre (CMLL), one of Mexico's largest wrestling promotions. During his time in CMLL he became involved in a long-running storyline feud against Olímpico, a storyline that led Brazo de Platino losing his mask as he was forced to unmask after losing a Luchas de Apuestas, or bet match, on July 27, 2000, to Olímpico. The mask lost meant that all six Alvarado siblings had lost their masks in Luchas de Apuestas matches. Over the years Brazo de Platino became more of a "Special attraction" wrestler, brought in by a promoter for a few events but not working regularly, long term for any promotion. Brazo de Platino, as well as most of the other second-generation Alvarado brothers often lost their hair in Luchas de Apuestas matches, losing to wrestlers such as Black Warrior, El Dandy, Rey Bucanero, Zumbido, Alan Stone, Villano III, Villano IV, and Ray Mendoza Jr. Brazo de Platino even even lost his hair to how own brother, Súper Brazo, on at least two occasions, both times as a result of the brothers losing a Relevos Suicidas where they were forced to fight each other as a result. Platino began working for Toryumon Mexico in 2010 as he participated in their annual Yamaha Cup where Brazo de Platino and Brazo de Plata lost in the first round to El Hijo del Fantasma and Angélico. He also participated in the Dragonmania V "Dragon Scramble" match but lost to Hijo del Fantasma. For later Toryumon shows Brazo de Platino worked as the enmascarado character "Super Makita", a gimmick based on the show sponsor Makita power tools. In the first appearance as Super Makita he teamed up with "Super Suzuki", another sponsored character. The following year Platino (as Platino), participated in the "Dragon Scramble" match at DragonMania VI, but lost to Hajime Ohara. On February 2, 2013, Brazo de Platino and Súper Brazo took part in another chapter in the decade long feud between the Alvarado brothers and Los Villanos as the two lost a Luchas de Apuestas to Villano III and Villano IV and was once again shaved bald. On February 17, 2013, Súper Brazo and the rest of the Alvarado family held a special show, Homenaje a Shadito Cruz ("Homage to Shadito Cruz") where he teamed up with Súper Brazo and competed in the La Copa Shadito Cruz tournament, defeating El Hijo de Fishman and El Hijo de Canek before losing to their nephews Máximo and La Máscara in the semi-finals of the tournament.

The Alvarado family

The Alvarado wrestling family spans three generations starting with Shadito Cruz followed by his 6 sons and a third-generation of wrestlers that started working in the late 1990s. At least two different wrestlers have worked under the ring name "Brazo de Platino Jr." The first Brazo de Platino Jr. was Jose Cristian Alvarado Ruiz, the son of José Luis Alvarado (Brazo de Plata), who used the name since someone else was already wrestling as "Brazo de Plata Jr. He used the name until changing his ring character in 2004 to Maximo. In 2010 another wrestler began working as Brazo de Platino Jr. but it was never confirmed if he truly was the son of Alvarado, a member of the Alvarado family or someone who was allowed to use the name and thus only had a storyline, or fictional, connection to the family.

On May 19, 2017 footage of Daniel Alvarado and other members of the Alvarado family, notably his nephews José (Máximo Sexy), Felipe Alvarado (La Máscara), Psycho Clown and Robin, destroying the Ford Mustang belonging to José Gutiérrez, better known as Último Guerrero. The vandalism was reportedly motivated by the fact that Gutiérrez had spoken out against Felipe Alvarado as a possible the head of the wrestler's union after the death of Alvarado's father. The head of the CMLL wrestlers' union had been in the Avarado family for over a decade and the Alvarado family believed it should go to someone in their family. The following day CMLL reportedly fired both Felipe and José Alvarado.

† = deceased

Luchas de Apuestas record

Footnotes

References

1973 births
Alvarado wrestling family
Living people
Masked wrestlers
Mexican male professional wrestlers
Professional wrestlers from Mexico City